Marry the Girl may refer to:

 Marry the Girl (play), farce by George Arthurs and Arthur Miller
 Marry the Girl (1928 film), American film directed by Phil Rosen
 Marry the Girl (1935 film), British film directed by Maclean Rogers
 Marry the Girl (1937 film), American film directed by William C. McGann